The 1995 season was Shimizu S-Pulse's fourth season in existence and their third season in the J1 League. The club also competed in the Emperor's Cup. The team finished the season ninth in the league.

Review and events

League results summary

League results by round

Competitions

Domestic results

J.League

Emperor's Cup

Player statistics

 † player(s) joined the team after the opening of this season.

Transfers

In:

Out:

Transfers during the season

In
 Daniele Massaro (from A.C. Milan on July)
 Marco Aurelio Silva Businhani (on July)
 Santos (from Kashima Antlers on August)
 Marcelo Miguel Pelissari (from Guarani on September)
 Ryūzō Morioka (from Kashima Antlers)

Out
 Toninho (loan to Urawa Red Diamonds on August)
 Sidmar (on September)
 Akihiro Nagashima (to Vissel Kobe)
 Fumiaki Aoshima (to Tosu Futures)

Awards
none

Notes

References

Other pages
 J. League official site
 Shimizu S-Pulse official site

Shimizu S-Pulse
Shimizu S-Pulse seasons